Lothar Maier (born 19 June 1944) is a German politician. Born in Wolfach, Baden-Württemberg, he represents Alternative for Germany (AfD). Lothar Maier has served as a member of the Bundestag from the state of Baden-Württemberg since 2017.

Life 
He became member of the bundestag after the 2017 German federal election. He is a member of the Committee on Legal Affairs and Consumer Protection.

References

External links 

  
 Bundestag biography 

1944 births
Living people
Members of the Bundestag for Baden-Württemberg
Members of the Bundestag 2017–2021
Members of the Bundestag for the Alternative for Germany